William Esuman-Gwira Sekyi, better known as Kobina Sekyi (1 November 1892, Cape Coast – 20 June 1956), was a nationalist lawyer, politician and writer in the Gold Coast.

Biography
Sekyi was the son of John Gladstone Sackey, headmaster of the Wesleyan School in Cape Coast, who was himself the son of Chief Kofi Sekyi, the Chief Regent of Cape Coast  and Wilhelmina Pietersen, also known as Amba Paaba, daughter of Willem Essuman Pietersen (c.1844–1914), an Elmina-Cape Coast businessman and one-time President of the Aborigines' Rights Protection Society (ARPS), a later president of which was Sekyi's uncle, Henry van Hien, whose heir Sekyi was.

Sekyi was educated at Mfantsipim School and studied philosophy at the University of London, accompanied to Britain by his maternal grandfather. He had originally wanted to become an engineer like his mother's younger brother, J. B. Essuman-Gwira, but because his family controlled the purse strings and they wished him to study law, that was the career he entered. He was called to the Bar from the Inner Temple in 1918.  Sekyi became a lawyer in private practice in the Gold Coast. He was president of the Aborigines' Rights Protection Society, an executive member of the National Congress of British West Africa, and member of the Coussey Committee for constitutional change. He married Lilly Anna Cleanand, daughter of John Peter Cleanand and Elizabeth Vroom. 

Sekyi was popular as the first educated elite appearing in a colonial court in Ghanaian cloth "ntoma" as a lawyer. It is believed he vowed never to wear European clothes as totally African.

He died in Cape Coast, on 20 June 1956.

Works 
Sekyi's comedy The Blinkards (1915)  satirised the acceptance by a colonised society of the attitudes of the colonisers. His novel The Anglo-Fante was the first English-language novel written in the Cape Coast.

Notes

References
 Kofi Baku, "Kobina Sekyi of Ghana: An Annotated Bibliography of His Writings", The International Journal of African Historical Studies, 24:2, 1991.

1892 births
1956 deaths
Lawyers from Gold Coast (British colony)
Dramatists and playwrights from Gold Coast (British colony)
Members of the Inner Temple
20th-century dramatists and playwrights
University of Ghana alumni
Mfantsipim School alumni
People from Cape Coast